"Fire in My Soul" is a song by Dutch DJ Oliver Heldens, featuring guest vocals from American-born Zimbabwean singer/actress/reality television personality Alexandra "Shungudzo" Govere, who also co-wrote the single with Heldens and Oak Felder, who co-produced the track. The single is also Heldens' debut release on RCA Records, who he signed with in 2018. The track reached the top 10 on both Billboard's Dance/Mix Show Airplay (peaking at number 6 in March 2019) and Dance Club Songs charts (reaching number one in May 2019).

Background
The song was inspired by their love for African music and their diverse backgrounds. In an interview with Billboard, Heldens noted "We all come from very diverse parts of the world; The Netherlands (Helden), Turkey (Felder), Zimbabwe, (and) the US (Govere was born in America, but her parents are of Zimbabwean, French, and Amerindian descent, and was raised in both countries). When we got into the studio, I told them I was very inspired by African music recently, so we started showing each other all this different African music we liked. That really got us in this vibe to create 'Fire In My Soul.'"

Charts

Weekly charts

Year-end charts

References

External links

2018 singles
2019 songs
Dance-pop songs
Electronic songs
House music songs
Oliver Heldens songs
RCA Records singles
Songs written by Oliver Heldens
Songs written by Oak Felder
Songs written by Shungudzo
Song recordings produced by Oak Felder